Sonia Kacem (born 1985) is a Swiss visual artist, of Swiss and Tunisian descent. She is known for her sculptures and installation art. She has lived in both Amsterdam, and Geneva.

Biography 
Sonia Kacem was born in 1985 in Geneva, Switzerland. Her mother is Swiss and her father is Tunisian. She studied at Geneva University of Art and Design, where she obtained a bachelor's degree in 2009 and then a master's degree in 2011.

Kacem was the winner of the Manor Cultural Prize  2014; Kiefer Hablitzel Göhner Art Prize in 2015; and the Zurich Art Prize 2021, from the museum Haus Konstruktiv and the Zurich Insurance Group Ltd. From 2016 to 2017, she was awarded a residency and grant from the Rijksakademie van Beeldende Kunsten, in Amsterdam. In 2019, she was awarded the residency at Pro Helvetia Cairo.

Her work is in museum collections, including at Migros Museum of Contemporary Art.

Solo exhibitions 

 2021, museum Haus Konstruktiv, Zurich, Switzerland
 2019, Between the Scenes, Westfälischer Kunstverein, Münster, Germany
 2018, Did snow fall on the pyramids?, T293, Rome, Italy

 2017, Carcass, Swiss Cultural Center, Paris, France

 2016, Night Shift, Centre d’Art Contemporain, Geneva, Switzerland

 2015, The Flâneur, T293, Naples, Italy
 2015, Bermuda Triangle, Kunsthalle St. Gallen, St. Gallen, Switzerland
 2015, Loulou Replay, Kunstverein Nürnberg, Nuremberg, Germany

 2014, Loulou, MAMCO, Geneva, Switzerland

 2013, Petra, Gregor Staiger, Zürich, Switzerland
 2013, Thérèse, Athenaeum Palace, Salle Crosnier, Geneva, Switzerland
 2011, Progress MI 07, Gregor Staiger, Zürich, Switzerland

References 

1985 births
Artists from Geneva
Swiss people of Tunisian descent
Geneva University of Art and Design alumni
Swiss installation artists
Swiss sculptors
Living people